Elatostema grande is a flowering plant in the nettle family. The specific epithet alludes to the relatively large leaves and inflorescences.

Description

Distribution and habitat
The species is endemic to Australia’s subtropical Lord Howe Island in the Tasman Sea. It is uncommon but widespread in the southern forests of the island, with a preference for mesic habitats.

References

grande
Rosales of Australia
Endemic flora of Lord Howe Island
Plants described in 1856
Taxa named by Hugh Algernon Weddell